The Ludwigshafen Challenger is a professional tennis tournament played on clay courts. It is currently part of the ATP Challenger Tour. It is held annually in Ludwigshafen, Germany since 2019.

Past finals

Singles

Doubles

References

External links
 Official website (in German)

ATP Challenger Tour
Clay court tennis tournaments
Tennis tournaments in Germany
Recurring sporting events established in 2019